O, My Darling Clementine is a 1943 American musical film directed by Frank McDonald and written by Dorrell McGowan and Stuart E. McGowan. The film stars Roy Acuff, Isabel Randolph, Harry Cheshire, Frank Albertson, Lorna Gray, and Irene Ryan. The film released on December 31, 1943, by Republic Pictures.

Plot

Cast 
Roy Acuff as Sheriff Roy Acuff
Isabel Randolph as Abigail Uppington
Harry Cheshire as 'Pappy' Cheshire 
Frank Albertson as 'Dapper' Dan Franklin
Lorna Gray as Clementine Cheshire
Irene Ryan as Irene
Eddie Parks as Luke Scully
Loie Bridge as Ellie Scully
Patricia Knox as Bubbles
Tom Kennedy as Bill Collector
Edwin Stanley as Hartfield
Emmett Vogan as Brown

References

External links 
 
 

1943 films
Country music films
American musical films
1943 musical films
Republic Pictures films
Films directed by Frank McDonald
American black-and-white films
1940s English-language films
1940s American films
English-language musical films